Evangelista Torricelli was one of four s built for the  (Royal Italian Navy) during the 1930s.

Design and description
The Archimede class was an improved and enlarged version of the earlier . They displaced  surfaced and  submerged. They had an operational diving depth of  Their crew numbered 55 officers and enlisted men.

For surface running, the boats were powered by two  diesel engines, each driving one propeller shaft. When submerged each propeller was driven by a  electric motor. They could reach  on the surface and  underwater.

The boats were armed with eight  torpedo tubes, four each in the bow and in the stern for which they carried a total of 16 torpedoes. They were also armed with a pair of  deck guns, one each fore and aft of the conning tower, for combat on the surface. Their anti-aircraft armament consisted of two single  machine guns.

Construction and career
Evangelista Torricelli was laid down by Cantieri navali Tosi di Taranto at their Taranto shipyard in 1931, launched on 27 May 1934 and completed later that year. During the Spanish Civil War the boat torpedoed and badly damaged the Republican light cruiser  while at anchor off Cartagena on 22 November 1936. An attack on the battleship  was thwarted when the British destroyer  got in the way. During a second patrol in January 1937, she bombarded Barcelona harbor on the night of 18/19 January and missed the  cargo ship  with three torpedoes off Tarragona on 19 January. The following day the boat narrowly missed colliding with the 2,174 GRT cargo ship . She was transferred to the Nationalists in April 1937.

Notes

Bibliography

External links
 Evangelista Torricelli (1934) Marina Militare website

Archimede-class submarines
World War II submarines of Italy
1934 ships
Ships built by Cantieri navali Tosi di Taranto
Ships built in Taranto
Italy–Spain military relations
Submarines of the Spanish Navy